A penumbral lunar eclipse will take place on January 21, 2038. It will be visible to the naked eye as 89.96% of the Moon will be immersed in Earth's penumbral shadow.

Visibility

Related lunar eclipses

Lunar year series

Saros cycle 
Lunar Saros series 144, repeating every 18 years and 11 days, has a total of 71 lunar eclipse events including 20 total lunar eclipses.

First Penumbral Lunar Eclipse: 1749 Jul 29

First Partial Lunar Eclipse: 2146 Mar 28

First Total Lunar Eclipse: 2308 Jul 04

First Central Lunar Eclipse: 2362 Aug 06

Greatest Eclipse of the Lunar Saros 144: 2416 Sep 07

Last Central Lunar Eclipse: 2488 Oct 20

Last Total Lunar Eclipse: 2651 Jan 28

Last Partial Lunar Eclipse: 2867 Jun 08

Last Penumbral Lunar Eclipse: 3011 Sep 04

See also 
List of lunar eclipses and List of 21st-century lunar eclipses

Notes

External links 
 

2038-01
2038-01
2038 in science